Kumba M'bye, (born 5 February 1983) is a Swedish rap artist and former model.

Early life
Kumba grew up in Malmö and Landskrona.

Career

In the early 2000s she started rapping and writing lyrics in English. During the summer of 2013 the rapper Stor heard her rapping and invited her to do an audition at the record label Redline Records. Inspired by the rappers Linda Pira and Lilla Namo she started writing lyrics in Swedish.

In 2014, she collaborated with Pira on her music single "Knäpper mina fingrar". This led to Kumba being able to participate in a hiphop concert at the Dramaten for female rappers only. She has also participated in the Sveriges Radio show "En kärleksattack på svensk hiphop". In 2014, her music single "I staden" was released for Redline Records. At the 2015 Kingsize gala she was nominated for Best Newcomer of 2015.

In 2015, Kumba participated in the TV-show Lyckliga gatan broadcast on TV4 where she had to make a new version of the Kicki Danielsson song "Bra vibrationer, while Danielsson made a new version of Kumbas song "I staden".

Kumba has also been modelling, having participated as a contestant on the first season of Top Model where she was eliminated on the 5th episode of Sweden pre-selection round.

Singles

References

Living people
1983 births
Swedish women rappers
21st-century Swedish musicians
21st-century women musicians